Lourdes Adriana López Moreno (born 28 January 1978) is a Mexican politician affiliated with the PVEM. She currently serves as a Deputy of the LXII Legislature of the Mexican Congress, representing Chiapas.

References

1978 births
Living people
People from Chiapas
Women members of the Chamber of Deputies (Mexico)
Ecologist Green Party of Mexico politicians
21st-century Mexican politicians
21st-century Mexican women politicians
Deputies of the LXII Legislature of Mexico
Members of the Chamber of Deputies (Mexico) for Chiapas